The 2000 season was the San Diego Chargers' 31st in the National Football League (NFL), their 41st overall and their second under head coach Mike Riley. The Chargers failed to improve on their 8–8 record from 1999, and finished the season 1–15, the worst record of any Chargers team in history. The team lost its first eleven games before their only victory of the season against the Kansas City Chiefs (by one point, which was obtained on a last-second field goal). The 2000 Chargers were also the first team to finish 1–15 and have their only win of the season be at home. Oddly enough, out of the eleven teams in NFL history to finish 1–15, only three others had their only win at home (2007 Dolphins, 2016 Browns, and 2020 Jaguars). The Chargers were also the third 1–15 team to win their lone game by a single point; the others, the 1980 Saints and 1991 Colts, each defeated the New York Jets on the road. It was also Ryan Leaf’s final season with the Chargers.

San Diego had a historically inept running attack in 2000; their 1,062 total team rushing yards (66.4 per game) is the lowest total of rushing yards by any team in NFL history in a 16-game season. For perspective, the strike-shortened 1982 NFL season—which was a nine-game schedule—included thirteen teams who rushed for more yards than San Diego did in 2000, and the 1992 Seahawks, who scored only 140 points in 16 games, rushed for 1,596 yards.

Despite this, there were a few bright spots; Darren Bennett and Junior Seau would be selected for the Pro Bowl that year.

After their miserable season, the Chargers earned the first overall pick in the next season's draft. The Chargers would trade that pick to the Falcons and draft LaDainian Tomlinson and also Drew Brees.

The last remaining active member of the 2000 San Diego Chargers was David Binn, who played his final NFL game in the 2011 playoffs, although he played his final regular season game in 2010.

Offseason

NFL draft

Personnel

Staff

Roster

Schedule

Standings

References

San Diego Chargers
San Diego Chargers seasons
San Diego